Donald is an unincorporated community in northwestern Long County, Georgia, United States. It lies a short distance away from the concurrent U.S. Routes 25 and 301, to the northwest of the city of Ludowici, the county seat of Long County.  Its elevation is 79 feet (24 m).

References

Unincorporated communities in Long County, Georgia
Unincorporated communities in Georgia (U.S. state)